"Moving Pictures" is the final track on The Kinks' 1979 album Low Budget. Like the other ten tracks on the album, it was written by Ray Davies.

Lyrics and music

The lyrics of "Moving Pictures" focus on how life passes people by. It laments on how life is "always moving" and that "nothing in life is a permanent fixture". It then goes on to analyze life in general, with lines such as "we live, we die, no one knows why" and " life can sometimes not be very nice, but then you make your choice so you must pay the price." It then warns that "Life is only what you make out so make the verses rhyme and all the pieces fit, there isn't any time to make much sense of it, it soon fades away." It also makes mention of racial problems, with the line "black girls, white girls oh what a mixture, looking as pretty as a picture."

The track, like "(Wish I Could Fly Like) Superman" (the lead single from Low Budget), attempts a disco feel, with a steady drum beat opening the song. Also, like most Kinks tracks, Ray Davies handles the lead vocal, which is double tracked at certain points during the track. Like the bulk of the album, Moving Pictures was recorded at the Power Station, a studio located in New York City.

Personnel 
As per the credits given on Low Budget.

Ray Davies - lead vocals, synthesizer, piano

Dave Davies - lead guitar, backing vocals

Jim Rodford - bass guitar, backing vocals

Mick Avory - drums

Release and reception

"Moving Pictures" was released as the second U.K. single from Low Budget, backed with "In a Space", a track also from Low Budget. It was not very commercially successful, as it did not make a dent in the charts. The single was not released in either the United States or Continental Europe.

The track was considered "blandly reflective" by Rolling Stone. According to author Johnny Rogan, he described the track as a perspective of life seen through the eyes of an “impermanent film”. When released, Melody Maker described the track as "an amiable, proficient shuffle, but the lyrics hardly approach the timeless elliptical acuity of 1960s material like 'Fancy' or 'Wonder Boy.

References

The Kinks songs
Songs written by Ray Davies
Song recordings produced by Ray Davies
1979 songs
1979 singles
Arista Records singles